Lachnagrostis billardierei, commonly known as coast blown-grass or sand wind grass, is a species of plant in the true grass family. The genus name means “woolly agrostis” with reference to the closely related genus Agrostis; the specific epithet billardierei honours French botanist Jacques Labillardière (1755-1834).

Description
It grows as a smooth, tufted annual or short-lived perennial grass up to about 50 cm in height. It is usually found on sandy, soils along or near the coast. It forms circular tufts of leaf blades and straw-coloured flowers. The seeds are wind-dispersed.

Distribution
Its principal area of occurrence is south-eastern Australia and New Zealand, though there are also records from the Warren IBRA bioregion of south-western Western Australia. The subspecies L. b. tenuiseta was once thought to be endemic to Tasmania (where it is commonly known as small-awned blown-grass), though it has subsequently been recorded from New Zealand.

References

Pooideae
Poales of Australia
Plants described in 1810
Flora of New South Wales
Flora of South Australia
Flora of Tasmania
Flora of Victoria (Australia)
Flora of New Zealand